Supun Withanaarachchi (born 18 May 1997) is a Sri Lankan cricketer. He made his first-class debut for Galle Cricket Club in Tier B of the 2017–18 Premier League Tournament Tier on 15 December 2017.

References

External links
 

1997 births
Living people
Sri Lankan cricketers
Galle Cricket Club cricketers
People from Anuradhapura